Ajina tepe is an ancient ruined Buddhist monastery cluster 12 km east from the city of Bokhtar in Tajikistan. The site is being considered to be put on the World Heritage list of sites that have "outstanding universal value" to the world.

Buddhism in Tokharistan is said to have enjoyed a revival under the Western Turks. Several monasteries dated to the 7th-8th centuries display beautiful Buddhist works of art, such as Kalai Kafirnigan, Ajina Tepe, Khisht Tepe or Kafyr Kala, around which Turkic nobility and populations followed Hinayana Buddhism.

World Heritage Status 
This site was added to the UNESCO World Heritage Tentative List on September 11, 1999 in the Cultural category.

Notes

References 
Buddhistic cloister of Ajina-Tepa - UNESCO World Heritage Centre Accessed 2009-3-3.

Tajikistani culture
Archaeological sites in Tajikistan
Buddhism in Tajikistan